Killanena GAA is a Gaelic Athletic Association club located in the village of Killanena, County Clare in Ireland.  The club is exclusively concerned with the game of hurling.

In 2016, Killanena's Gerry O'Connor was named as the new joint manager of the Clare senior hurling team alongside Donal Moloney.

Major honours
 Clare Senior Hurling Championship (1): 1975 (as Brian Boru's with Bodyke & Tulla)
 Clare Intermediate Hurling Championship (1): 2010 
 Clare Junior A Hurling Championship (3): 1970, 1977, 1994 
 Clare Under-21 A Hurling Championship (1): 2017 (with Feakle)

References

External links
Official Site

Gaelic games clubs in County Clare
Hurling clubs in County Clare